C. volutella may refer to:

 Calonectria volutella, an ascomycete fungus
 Colletotrichum volutella, a plant pathogen